This timeline of stegosaur research is a chronological listing of events in the history of paleontology focused on the stegosaurs, the iconic plate-backed, spike-tailed herbivorous eurypod dinosaurs that predominated during the Jurassic period. The first scientifically documented stegosaur remains were recovered from Early Cretaceous strata in England during the mid-19th century. However, they would not be recognized as a distinct group of dinosaurs until Othniel Charles Marsh described the new genus and species Stegosaurus armatus in 1877, which he regarded as the founding member of the Stegosauria. This new taxon originally included all armored dinosaurs. It was not until 1927 that Alfred Sherwood Romer implemented the modern use of the name Stegosauria as specifically pertaining to the plate-backed and spike-tailed dinosaurs.

From the time of their earliest description, the chief mystery surrounding stegosaurs was the function of their distinctive back plates. Marsh originally interpreted them as being plates of armor that would protect against predators. In 1910, Richard Swann Lull would agree with this hypothesis. Charles Whitney Gilmore disagreed in 1914 and argued that the only protection a stegosaur could gain from its plates was to appear intimidatingly larger to potential predators. Nearly forty years later, Davitashvili argued that the plates were too fragile to be used for defense and instead used to attract mates and signal the stegosaur's rank in a social hierarchy.

In the late 1970s, James O. Farlow and others would propose that the thin, blood vessel-rich plates helped absorb or lose body heat, depending on the animal's own physiological requirements. This hypothesis was put forth in a broader context of scientists considering the possibility that dinosaurs may have maintained body temperatures and activity levels similar to those of modern birds and mammals, in which case the plates may have served primarily to shed heat rather than gain it. In the late 1980s Buffrenil and others revived the idea that stegosaur plates were display structures, an interpretation that would continue to find favor from researchers like Main and colleagues into the 21st century.

19th century

1840s
1841
 Gideon Mantell described the new genus and species Regnosaurus northamptoni.

1870s

1874
 Harry Govier Seeley described the new genus and species Craterosaurus pottonensis.

1875
 Sir Richard Owen described the new genus and species Omosaurus armatus.

1876
 Owen described the new species Anthodon serrarius.

1877
 Othniel Charles Marsh described the new genus and species Stegosaurus armatus.
 Marsh named the Stegosauria.
 Owen described the new species Omosaurus hastiger.

1878
 Edward Drinker Cope described the new genus and species Hypsirhophus discurus.

1879
 Cope described the new species Hypsirhophus seeleyanus.

1880s

1880
 Marsh named the Stegosauridae.
 Marsh interpreted the plates of Stegosaurus as an armored covering and its spines as natural weapons.
 Marsh described the new species Stegosaurus affinis.

1881
 Marsh described the new genus and species Diracodon laticeps.

1884
 Hulke reported a Cretaceous stegosaur pubis from England.

1887
 Hulke described the new species Omosaurus durobrivensis.
 Marsh described the new species Stegosaurus sulcatus.
 Marsh described the new species Stegosaurus duplex. Marsh described the new species Stegosaurus stenops.

1890s

1891
 Marsh provided an illustrated description of Stegosaurus ungulatus, with a row of erect plates running along the centre of its back.

1893
 Harry Govier Seeley described the new species Omosaurus phillipsi.

20th century

1900s

1901
 Seeley described the new species Omosaurus leedsi.

1902
 Frederick Augustus Lucas described the new genus Dacentrurus to house the species Omosaurus armatus.

1905
 Loomis argued that the plates adorning the backs of stegosaurs were maladaptive traits that sapped their vigor and signaled their impending extinction. Similar arguments would later be extended to the extinction of the dinosaurs overall by Woodward in 1910.

1910s
1910
 Von Huene described the species Omosaurus vetustus.
 Richard Swann Lull followed Marsh's interpretation of Stegosaurus plates as armor and its tail spines as "defensive" weapons.

1911
 Franz Nopcsa described the new species Omosaurus lennieri. He also described the new species Stegosaurus priscus.

1912
 Robert Broom described the new species Palaeoscincus africanus.

1914

 Charles Whitney Gilmore described Stegosaurus longispinus. He agreed with previous workers that Stegosaurus used its spines to protect itself, but dismissed the idea that its plates functioned as armor. However, Gilmore conceded that the plates may have helped protect it by making it appear intimidatingly large to predators.

1915
 Edwin Hennig described the new genus and species Kentrosaurus aethiopicus.

1916
 Nopcsa renamed Kentrosaurus into Doryphorosaurus.
 Hennig renamed Kentrosaurus into Kentrurosaurus. Both new names were unnecessary.

1920s

1924
 Hennig described the distribution of Kentrosaurus bones in Quarry St at Tendaguru, Tanzania. He observed that at one place in the quarry multiple sacra were found near each other, while another area of the quarry contained limb bones, and yet another preserved vertebrae.

1927
 Alfred Sherwood Romer observed that the anatomy of the stegosaur pelvis and hindlimb as well as their primarily Jurassic age distinguished them from the mainly Cretaceous ankylosaurs. As the Stegosauria originally included all armored dinosaurs, Romer's distinction marked the beginning of the modern use of the name to refer to the plate-backed and spike-tailed dinosaurs.

1929
 Nopcsa erected the new taxon Paranthodon oweni for the same material as Palaeoscincus africanus.

1940s
1944
 Yang Zhongjian ("C. C. Young") reported indeterminate stegosaur remains from the Kuangyuan Series. They are among the oldest known stegosaur bones.

1950s

1951
 Young described the new genus and species Chialingosaurus kuani.

1957
 De Lapparent and Georges Zbyszewski described the new species Astrodon pusillus.
 De Lapparent and Zbyszewski reported a possible stegosaur egg associated with a Dacentrurus skeleton from Portugal. However, as the mysterious object lacks a shell, it is now considered to be a nodule of geologic rather than biological origin.
 Hoffstetter described the new genus Lexovisaurus to house the species Omosaurus durobrivensis.

1960s

1961
 Davitashvili marshalled further evidence against the hypothesis that stegosaur plates functioned as armor. He observed that the plates would be ineffective as armor because they were thin, only shallowly embedded in the skin, and left most of the animal's sides exposed. He felt they were used as display structures to attract mates and signal an individuals position within a social hierarchy.

1963
 Nicholas Hotton III proposed that stegosaur plates could be moved by flexing muscles in the skin, allowing the plates to function defensively, discouraging attacks from either above or the side depending on the plates' position at any given time.

1966
 Dorothy Hill and others reported a possible Early Jurassic stegosaur footprint from Australia.
 John Ostrom and John Stanton McIntosh reported that Stegosaurus remains were unusually common in Quarry 13 at Como Bluff, Wyoming.

1970s

1973
 Dong Zhiming described the new genus and species Wuerhosaurus homheni.

1976

 James O. Farlow and others proposed that stegosaur plates were used to help regulate the animal's body temperature. Their alternating placement along its spine would allow them to dissipate its body heat by acting as forced-convection fins, the researchers argued.

1977
 Dong and others described the new genus and species Tuojiangosaurus multispinus.

1978
 Robert T. Bakker proposed that contrary to the prevailing interpretation of stegosaurs as low browsers, they were actually high browsers who fed on high foliage by rearing up on their hind limbs and propping themselves up in this position with their tail.
 Walter Coombs argued based on their limb anatomy that stegosaurs were graviportal animals.

1979
 P.M. Yadagiri and Krishnan Ayyasami described the new genus and species Dravidosaurus blanfordi based on fragmentary material assumed to include a skull and plates. Since it was dated to the Coniacian it would have been the most recent known surviving stegosaur taxon. The authors also reported the existence of Maastrichtian stegosaur remains, but they did not describe these fossils.
 Michael Seidel argued that while the plates of Stegosaurus were used to help regulate its body temperature, they were actually used to absorb heat rather than lose it as argued by Farlow and others in 1976.

1980s

1980
 Dale Russell and others reconstructed the ancient environment of Tendaguru, Tanzania as a warm coastal area that sometimes experienced droughts. The stegosaur Kentrosaurus was present there, although not especially common. Its local fossil record consists largely of "medium-sized" members of the species.

1981

 Peter Malcolm Galton observed that stegosaurs were uncommon during the Cretaceous period.

1982
 Dong, Tang Zilu, and Zhou Shiwu described the new genus and species Huayangosaurus taibaii as well as the Huayangosauridae.
 Nikolaï Spassov argued that the plates of stegosaurs were used as display structures in competitions over mates. Their orientation made them best suited to being viewed from the side.
 Galton studied the growth and development of Stegosaurus.
 Galton found that Kentrosaurus came in two varieties, one with an extra sacral rib. He speculated that this morph with the extra sacral rib was the female and the other morph lacking the rib was male.

 Ralph Molnar published more research on the possible Early Jurassic stegosaur track from Australia.
 Jacques Jenny and Jean-Arsène Jossen reported a possible Pliensbachian stegosaur trackway from Morocco.

1983
 Dong, Zhou and Zhang Yihong described the new genus and species Chungkingosaurus jiangbeiensis.
 Galton and Harry Philip Powell reported stegosaur armor and vertebrae from the Early Bajocian of England. These are among the oldest known stegosaur bones.
Comic Artist Gary Larson humorously suggests the tail spikes on a stegosaur be named the Thagomizer.

1984
 Giuseppe Leonardi attributed Early Cretaceous footprints of the ichnogenus Caririchnium to stegosaurs.
 Zhou observed that the Bathonian to Callovian Huayangosaurus was among the oldest known stegosaur fossils.
 Vivian de Buffrénil and others studied the histology of a Stegosaurus plate. They concluded that since the Sharpey's fibers that anchored it within the animal's skin were symmetrical it could not be moved. They also argued that there was no physical evidence in the anatomy of the plate to suggest that it was covered by horn in life. The researchers dismissed the idea that the plates could function as armor on the grounds that they were too fragile. They also doubted that the plates were used as threat displays for intimidation because "they could not unfold suddenly". They found that the plates were more likely used as sexual displays to attract mates or help regulate the animal's body temperature. They proposed that the plates were covered by a skin dense with blood vessels that helped exchange heat by both convection and radiation. They argued that their hypothesis was compatible with both major competing interpretations of dinosaur thermophysiology since if Stegosaurus was cold-blooded the plates could be used to absorb heat while if it was warm-blooded the plates could shed the excess heat that its body produced.

 David Weishampel observed that the stiff construction of the stegosaur skull rendered its jaws capable only of simple straight up-and-down movements. This distinguishes them from some other herbivorous dinosaur groups like ornithopods which were capable of complex chewing motions.
 Weishampel interpreted Stegosaurus as a browser whose diet consisted of low-growing foliage and "the fleshy parts of bennettitalean inflorescences plus the fructifications of Nilssoniales and Caytoniales plant groups."
 Xia Wei and others interpreted the ancient environment of the Lower Shaximiao Formation where Huayangosaurus was preserved as the still, shallow water of an ancient lake.

1985
 Daniel Brinkman and Conway studied the bone texture and mineralogy of stegosaur plates.
 Galton observed that the plates of Lexovisaurus were large, thin, and rich in blood vessels like Stegosaurus plates are.

1986
 Robert Bakker expanded on his hypothesis that stegosaurs were high browsers that fed while rearing up on their hindlimbs. He also supported the idea that stegosaur plates were mobile armor that could defend the animal's back or flanks depending on what angle to which they were flexed. He also argued that the anatomy of the tail of Stegosaurus rendered it more flexible than that of other bird-hipped dinosaurs, whose tails were often stiffened by bony tendons. He hypothesized that Stegosaurus could "push off" using its massive chest muscles to turn its body about its back legs.
 Buffrénil and others studied the histology of a Stegosaurus plate. They concluded that since the Sharpey's fibers that anchored it within the animal's skin was symmetrical that it couldn't be moved. They also argued that there was no physical evidence in the anatomy of the plate to suggest that it was covered by horn in life. The researchers dismissed the idea that the plates could function as armor on the grounds that they were too fragile. They also doubted that the plates were used as threat displays for intimidation because "they could not unfold suddenly". They found that the plates were more likely used as sexual displays to attract mates or help regulate the animal's body temperature. They proposed that the plates were covered by a skin dense with blood vessels that helped exchange heat by both convection and radiation. They argued that their hypothesis was compatible with both major competing interpretations of dinosaur thermophysiology since if Stegosaurus was cold-blooded the plates could be used to absorb heat while if it was warm-blooded the plates could shed the excess heat that its body produced.

1987
 Martin Lockley disputed Leonardi's attribution of the Brazilian Caririchnium tracks to stegosaurs. Instead, Lockley concluded that they were left by hadrosaurs walking on all fours.

1987
 Farlow examined the possible distinct feeding strategies exploited by stegosaurs that enabled them to flourish alongside other ornithischians during the Middle and Late Jurassic.

1987
 Malcolm James Coe and others disputed Robert Bakker's reinterpretation of stegosaurs as high browsers, observing that even if stegosaurs were capable of rearing like Bakker portrays, that it doesn't imply it was their normal feeding posture since elephants are also physically capable of standing on their hind limbs but do not feed in this stance. Instead, Coe and the other researchers supported the traditional view of Stegosaurus as feeding on plants one meter high or less.

1990s

1990
 Dong published the new genus and species name Monkonosaurus lawulacus but attributed it to Zhou.

1991
 Dayton reported possible Early Cretaceous stegosaur footprints from Australia.

1992
 Boneham and Forsey reported stegosaur armor and vertebrae from the Early Bajocian of England. These are among the oldest known stegosaur bones.

1993
 Dong described the new species Wuerhosaurus ordosensis.
Kenneth Carpenter uses Thagomizer formally to describe stegosaur tail spikes, moving the term from humor to informal designation of the anatomy.

1994
 Sara Metcalf and Rachel Walker reported a stegosaur tooth from the early Bajocian of England. It is among the oldest known stegosaur remains.

1996
 José Fernando Bonaparte reported fragmentary Early Cretaceous stegosaur remains from Argentina.
 Bonaparte reported fragmentary Early Cretaceous stegosaur remains from Argentina.
 Sankar Chatterjee and Dhiraj Kumar Rudra argued that Dravidosaurus was actually a plesiosaur rather than a stegosaur.

1997
 Chatterjee expanded on his argument that Dravidosaurus was actually a plesiosaur rather than a stegosaur.
 Thulborn reported possible Early Cretaceous stegosaur footprints from Australia.
 Tracy Popowics and Fortelius reported wear facets on stegosaur teeth caused by physical interactions between teeth.

1998

 Paul Sereno proposed a stem-based definition of Stegosauria that included all taxa more closely related to Stegosaurus than to Ankylosauria.
 Kenneth Carpenter disputed Bakker's reinterpretation of Stegosaurs as high browsers. He argued that the plates along the animal's tail made it too rigid to be used as the third "leg" of the tripodal stance needed to support it in the rearing posture Bakker imagined stegosaurs adopted to reach high foliage. He noted that the first vertebra in the tail had a wedge shape that fit under a backward-facing projection of bone from the top of the last vertebra in the pelvis. This configuration would have held the tail out straight from the animal's body. Its other tail vertebrae show anatomical evidence for ligaments that would have assisted in keeping the tail aloft. Carpenter concluded that while the plates limited the mobility between individual vertebrae, the tail itself had enough range of motion to swing its spiked tip to an angle exceeding ninety degree from a resting position.

1999
 Sereno continued to use the stem-based definition of Stegosauria he proposed in 1998.
 Jean Le Loeuff and others reported some fossil footprints from France that may have been left behind by stegosaurs. As these tracks date back to the Hettangian, they may represent the oldest known stegosaur fossils.
 Wolf-Dieter Heinrich observed that stegosaur bones were common in Quarry X at Tendaguru, Tanzania. He interpreted the deposit as resulting from the gradual accumulation of remains in a fresh-to-brackish water environment.
 Stephen Czerkas argued that the beak near the front of the jaws of stegosaurs like Chungkingosaurus, Kentrosaurus, and Stegosaurus actually extended along the entire length of the jaw, like in turtles.
 Galton argued that stegosaurs were sexually dimorphic and the females had extra rib in their sacra.

21st century

2000s

2000
 Lockley and Christian Andreas Meyer published more research on the possible Hettangian stegosaur footprints from France.

 Russell Main and others disputed the idea that Stegosaurus used its plates to help regulate its body temperature because other kinds of stegosaurs have differently shaped plates. Instead they argued that these were display structures that helped stegosaurs recognize and acquire mates of their own species. The researchers also examined the histology of stegosaur plates. They found that during development the plates and spikes grew mainly from their bases and the structure of their interiors changed significantly as the animal matured. They hypothesized that stegosaur plates evolved by greatly expanding the raised keel of bone that ran the length of the nodules of bone embedded in the skin of armored dinosaurs. They concluded that processes of growth are the main reason why stegosaur plates showed so many signs of the presence of blood vessels instead of using the blood vessels to absorb or shed heat. They also noticed that structures in other dinosaur groups and even modern mammals like artiodactyls unrelated to heat regulation like horns and frills often show similar amount of vasculature to stegosaur plates.

2001
 Paul Michael Barrett found further anatomical support for the hypothesis that stegosaur jaws were only capable of opening and closing in a straight up-an-down fashion that precluded the complex chewing motions seen in some other herbivorous dinosaur groups. He concluded that the tooth-tooth wear facets reported by Popowics and Fortelius only formed as a result of teeth growing in at slightly different angles rather than tooth-tooth contact occurring as part of the animals' natural feeding strategy.
 Carpenter, Clifford Miles, and Karen Cloward described the new genus and species Hesperosaurus mjosi.
 Neil Donald Lewis Clark reported the discovery of near ends of a radius and ulna from Early Bajocian rocks in Scotland. Although they might be ankylosaur fossils, these are likely to be some of the oldest known stegosaur bones.
 Éric Buffetaut and others reported a stegosaur vertebra from Thailand. This was the first scientifically recognized stegosaur fossil from southeast Asia.
 William Blows reported Cretaceous stegosaur dermal armor from England.
 Darren Naish and David Martill reported Cretaceous stegosaur dermal armor from England.
 Galton and Paul Upchurch accepted Dravidosaurus as a stegosaur not taking notice of arguments made by Chatterjee and Rudma in the 1990s that it was actually a plesiosaur.

2004
 The Dinosauria's second edition reevaluated Dravidosaurus blanfordi as a stegosaur/plesiosaur chimera.

2007
 Jia Chengkai and others described the new genus and species Jiangjunosaurus junggarensis.

2008
 Maidment and others described the new genus Loricatosaurus.

2009
 Octávio Mateus, Susannah C. R. Maidment, and Nicolai A. Christiansen described the new genus and species Miragaia longicollum.

2010s
2015

 Robert P. Cameron, John A. Cameron and Stephen M. Barnett recognised that Stegosaurus exhibited exterior chirality and highlighted the need to distinguish a specimen from its distinct, hypothetical mirror-image form.

2016

 Peter M. Galton and Kenneth Carpenter described the new genus Alcovasaurus for the species "Stegosaurus" longispinus.
 Cameron, Cameron, and Barnett published another paper on exterior chirality in Stegosaurus.
2018
 Tumanova and Alifanov described the new genus and species Mongolostegus exspectabilis.
2019
 A study on the morphological diversity of stegosaurs through the evolutionary history of the group will be published by Romano (2019).
 A study on pathological characteristics of left femur of a specimen of Gigantspinosaurus sichuanensis from the Late Jurassic of China will be published by Hao et al. (2019), who interpret this specimen as probably affected by bone tumor.

2020s
2020
 Maidment and others described the new genus and species Adratiklit boulahfa.

See also
 History of paleontology
 Timeline of paleontology
 Timeline of ankylosaur research

Footnotes

References

External links
 

Stegosaurs
stegosaur